Leslie Henley (26 September 1922 – 1996) was an English footballer and manager.

Career

Playing
Born in Lambeth, London, Henley started his career with non-league Nunhead during the 1939–40 season before joining Arsenal in September 1940. He played 92 wartime matches for the club, scoring 15 goals - his only competitive game for the senior side being an FA Cup match against West Ham United in 1946. During this time he also guested for West Ham United in 1944-45. In December 1946 he joined Reading, and there he made 181 appearances and scored 29 goals in the league.

Managerial
He managed Bohemians after leaving Reading. He managed from Wimbledon 1955 until 1971.

Notes

1922 births
1996 deaths
English footballers
English football managers
Association football midfielders
Arsenal F.C. players
West Ham United F.C. wartime guest players
Reading F.C. players
Wimbledon F.C. managers
Brentford F.C. wartime guest players